Frøydis Meen Wærsted (born 15 June 1987) is a former road cyclist from Norway. She represented her nation at the 2009 UCI Road World Championships and 2010 UCI Road World Championships. She won the Norwegian National Road Race Championship in 2011.

References

External links
 
 
 

1987 births
Norwegian female cyclists
Living people
Place of birth missing (living people)
21st-century Norwegian women